"Rock Me Amadeus" is a song recorded by Austrian musician Falco, for his third studio album, Falco 3 (1985). The single was made available for physical sale in 1985 in German-speaking Europe, through A&M. "Rock Me Amadeus" was written by Falco along with Dutch music producers Bolland & Bolland. To date, the single is the only German language song to peak at number one of the Billboard Hot 100, which it did on 29 March 1986.

It topped the singles charts on both sides of the Atlantic. It was Falco's only number one hit in both the United States and the United Kingdom, despite the artist's popularity in his native Austria and much of Europe.

Background and production

Originally recorded in German, the song is about Wolfgang Amadeus Mozart, his popularity and his debts. A longer version (eight minutes), named the "Salieri Mix", appeared on the initial US release of the album Falco 3. The song was inspired by the movie Amadeus. For the US release, the song was remixed with an English background overlay. There was never a full English version.
The voice-over was performed by Rick McCullough, an acquaintance of Rob and Ferdi Bolland. McCullough is a successful television director in the Netherlands known for his 20 plus years as Director of the award winning series "Wie is de Mol?".
Voiceover facts
1756: Salzburg, January 27th, Wolfgang Amadeus is born.
1761: At the age of five Amadeus begins composing.
1773: He writes his first piano concerto.
1782: Wolfgang Amadeus Mozart marries Constanze Weber.
1784: Wolfgang Amadeus Mozart becomes a Freemason.
1791: Mozart composes The Magic Flute.
On December 5th of that same year, Mozart dies. (Requiem)
1985: Austrian rock singer Falco records... "Rock Me Amadeus"!

Official versions and remixes
The song was released in Europe in 1985 in its original, German-language version. For the international markets (United States, UK, Japan, etc.), several different single and extended mixes were produced by Rob Bolland; none of them were solely an English-language version, but the international single versions reduced the German lyrics. However, the video, which featured the original European version, was used worldwide.

 Original Version (a.k.a. The Gold Mix) (3:21)
 Extended Version (7:07)
 Salieri Version (8:21) (on the international versions of Falco 3 this mix is denoted wrongly as "Solieri Version")
 Short Salieri Version (4:50)
 Special Salieri Version (3:59)
 American Edit (3:10)
 Canadian Edit (4:02)
 Canadian/American Edit (3:59)
 Extended American Edit (5:50)
 Club Mix 1991 (6:47)
 Radio Remix 1991 (4:30)
 Instrumental Remix 1991 (1:29)
 Live Version 1985 (from the album Opus & Friends) (4:20)
 Live Version 1986 (from the album Live Forever) (6:04)
 Symphonic Remix 2008 (from the album Symphonic) (4:52)
 Live Symphonic Version 1994 (from the DVD Symphonic) (4:12)
 Falco Biography Mix 2010 (from the 25th Anniversary Edition of Falco 3) (download only) (8:48)
 Ogris Debris Wiener Mischung 2017 (from the Falco remix series JNG RMR) (4:50)
 Motsa's Dub Revibe 2017 (from the Falco remix series JNG RMR) (3:10)
 Wolfram Mix 2019 (from the album "Amadeus" by Wolfram) (4:36)
 Extended Canadian/American 2022 Re-Edit (from the best of album "The Sound Of Musik") (5:25)

Music video
The song's music video mixes elements of Mozart's time with 1980s contemporary society. Falco is shown in a 20th-century-style dinner jacket, walking past people in eighteenth-century formal wear. Later, he is shown dressed as Mozart, with wild colored hair, being held on the shoulders of men dressed in modern motorcycle-riding attire. At the end, the two crowds mix.

The video for the 1991 remix is a much more sexualized version, starting with the refrain 'sugar sweet', with extra footage spliced throughout, including a similar black carriage riding at night with the driver covered in lights, escorted by police motorcycles, scantily clad girls; in black leather riding outside it, and bright neon fashions inside, resembling earlier-century formal wear. A different crowd in a more Mozart-era formal attire was excessively fraternizing at a party. This version also contains red line art of Falco, guitar riff clips, and a long car scene driving away at the end, to a saxophone solo over the added refrain.

Commercial performance
With "Rock Me Amadeus", Falco became the first German-speaking artist to be credited with a number-one single on both mainstream US pop singles chart, the Billboard Hot 100 and Cash Box Top 100 Singles. Prior to Falco, "99 Luftballons" by Nena got to number one on Cash Box, but peaked at number two on the Billboard Hot 100. The single hit number one on the Billboard Hot 100 on 29 March 1986.

In the United Kingdom, where his "Der Kommissar" failed to make the charts, the song hit number one on 10 May 1986, becoming the first single by an Austrian act to achieve this distinction. "Vienna Calling" hit number 10 and three subsequent singles briefly charted.

In Canada, the song reached number one on 1 February 1986. (There, "Der Kommissar" had reached number 11 in January 1983, and "Vienna Calling" would hit number 8 in April 1986.)

"Rock Me Amadeus" would later be ranked number 87 in VH1's 100 Greatest Songs of the 80s and number 44 in VH1's 100 Greatest One-Hit Wonders.

In The Simpsons' episode A Fish Called Selma, Troy McClure performs this song as part of a Planet of the Apes Musical with the alternated lyrics Dr. Zaius.

Charts

Weekly charts

Year-end charts

Original version

Canadian/American '86 mix

All-time charts

Certifications

See also
List of Billboard Hot 100 number-one singles of 1986
List of Cash Box Top 100 number-one singles of 1986
Lists of number-one singles (Austria)
List of number-one singles of 1986 (Canada)
List of number-one hits of 1985 (Germany)
List of number-one singles from the 1980s (New Zealand)
List of number-one singles of 1986 (Ireland)
List of number-one singles and albums in Sweden
List of UK Singles Chart number ones of the 1980s

References

External links
Song review at AllMusic

1985 songs
1985 singles
1986 singles
A&M Records singles
Billboard Hot 100 number-one singles
Cashbox number-one singles
Songs about classical music
European Hot 100 Singles number-one singles
Falco (musician) songs
German-language songs
Songs written by Falco (musician)
Songs written by Ferdi Bolland
Songs written by Rob Bolland
Irish Singles Chart number-one singles
Number-one singles in Austria
Number-one singles in Germany
Number-one singles in New Zealand
Number-one singles in South Africa
Number-one singles in Spain
Number-one singles in Sweden
RPM Top Singles number-one singles
UK Singles Chart number-one singles
Cultural depictions of Wolfgang Amadeus Mozart